Trapelus ruderatus, Olivier's agama or Baluch ground agama, is a species of agama found in Azerbaijan,
Syria, Lebanon, Jordan, Saudi Arabia, Iraq, Iran, and Pakistan.

References

Trapelus
Lizards of Asia
Taxa named by Guillaume-Antoine Olivier
Reptiles described in 1804